The United Nations Educational, Scientific and Cultural Organization (UNESCO) World Heritage Sites are places of importance to cultural or natural heritage as described in the UNESCO World Heritage Convention, established in 1972. Peru ratified the convention on February 24, 1982, making its historical sites eligible for inclusion on the list.

, Peru has 13 sites on the World Heritage List. The first sites within Peru were inscribed on the list at the 7th Session of the World Heritage Committee, held in Florence, Italy in 1983: "City of Cuzco" and the "Historic Sanctuary of Machu Picchu". Nine sites are listed as cultural sites, two as natural, and two as mixed, meeting both cultural and natural selection criteria, as determined by the organization's selection criteria. The site Chan Chan Archaeological Zone was inscribed to the list in 1986 and immediately placed on the List of World Heritage in Danger as the adobe constructions are easily damaged by heavy rain and erosion. The Qhapaq Ñan, Andean Road System site is a transnational site, also shared with Argentina, Bolivia, Chile, Colombia, and Ecuador. In addition, there are eight sites on the tentative list.

World Heritage Sites
UNESCO lists sites under ten criteria; each entry must meet at least one of the criteria. Criteria i through vi are cultural, and vii through x are natural.

Tentative list 
In addition to the sites inscribed on the World Heritage list, member states can maintain a list of tentative sites that they may consider for nomination. Nominations for the World Heritage list are only accepted if the site was previously listed on the tentative list. , Peru recorded eight sites on its tentative list.

Notes
1.  Lima Province is the only one of the 195 provinces of Peru not within a region.

References

External links
 Comisión Nacional Peruana de Cooperación con UNESCO 
 UNESCO Office in Lima 

Peru
World Heritage Sites
 
World Heritage Sites